Margaret Sawyer may refer to:

Maggie Sawyer, a fictional character that appears in stories published by DC Comics
Peggy Sawyer, a fictional character in 42nd Street